Henry Washburn Berthrong  (January 1, 1844 – April 28, 1928) was an American professional baseball player, who played in 17 games for the Washington Olympics in 1871. He hit .233 in 73 at-bats.

He was a veteran of the Civil War and his chief fame was derived from his painting of candidates in U.S. Presidential elections. An example of one of these paintings was included in a March 2018 article in New York.

In the Civil War he served with the 140th New York Volunteers, Co. E. and the 5th Corps, Army of the Potomac, before he was discharged on July 13, 1865.

He then served with the Olympics in 1871 and afterwards joined the customs service.

References

External links

1844 births
1928 deaths
Major League Baseball outfielders
Washington Nationals (NABBP) players
Washington Olympics (NABBP) players
Washington Olympics players
Baseball players from New York (state)
19th-century baseball players
Union Army soldiers